Hamish Clive Carter  (born 28 April 1971 in Auckland) is a New Zealand triathlete. He won the gold medal in triathlon at the 2004 Summer Olympics, his second Olympic games. Carter also competed on the International Triathlon Union World Cup circuit as a professional for many years, culminating in a silver medal in 2006 before announcing his retirement early in 2007. During his career he won twelve ITU world cup races.

Carter attended Auckland Grammar School where he was a successful rower, competing twice in the Maadi Cup.

Carter won the bronze medal in triathlon at the 2002 Commonwealth Games and then went on to win the triathlon gold medal at the 2004 Summer Olympics, defeating fellow New Zealander, Bevan Docherty.  Carter's time was 1:51:07.73, less than eight seconds faster than Docherty's. On 3 September 2006 in Lausanne, Carter won silver at the World Championships after finishing 17 seconds behind Tim Don. In October 2006, Hamish Carter won the Xterra World Championship in Maui, Hawaii defeating a field of more experienced off-road triathletes.

On 6 March 2007 he announced his retirement.

References

1971 births
Commonwealth Games bronze medallists for New Zealand
People educated at Auckland Grammar School
Living people
Officers of the New Zealand Order of Merit
Olympic gold medalists for New Zealand
Olympic triathletes of New Zealand
Sportspeople from Auckland
Triathletes at the 2000 Summer Olympics
Triathletes at the 2002 Commonwealth Games
Triathletes at the 2004 Summer Olympics
Triathletes at the 2006 Commonwealth Games
Olympic medalists in triathlon
Medalists at the 2004 Summer Olympics
New Zealand male triathletes
Commonwealth Games medallists in triathlon
Medallists at the 2002 Commonwealth Games